Mahmoud Kojok may refer to:

 Mahmoud Ahmad Kojok (born 1990), Lebanese association football midfielder
 Mahmoud Mohammad Kojok (born 1991), Lebanese association football striker